The System Average Interruption Duration Index (SAIDI) is commonly used as a reliability index by electric power utilities.  SAIDI is the average outage duration for each customer served, and is calculated as:

In other words,

SAIDI is measured in units of time, often minutes or hours. It is usually measured over the course of a year, and according to IEEE Standard 1366-1998 the median value for North American utilities is approximately 1.50 hours.

Comparison of SAIDI by country 
The following is a table of SAIDI for different countries; the share of renewable energy (gross electricity consumption) is also given:

*, ** = Alternative SAIDI (e.g. T-SAIDI)

References

Electric power
Reliability indices